Johnny Per Buduson (born 9 September 1991) is a Norwegian footballer who plays for Skeid.

He originally joined Skeid from Klemetsrud ahead of the 2014 season.

Career statistics

References

1991 births
Living people
Footballers from Oslo
Norwegian footballers
Eliteserien players
Skeid Fotball players
FK Haugesund players
Fredrikstad FK players
Hamarkameratene players
Norwegian First Division players
Norwegian Second Division players
Association football forwards